Begonia hatacoa is a species of flowering plant in the family Begoniaceae, native to Tibet, Nepal, the eastern Himalayas, Assam, Bangladesh, Myanmar, Thailand, and Vietnam. Its best-known cultivar is 'Silver'.

Subtaxa
The following varieties are accepted:
Begonia hatacoa var. hatacoa
Begonia hatacoa var. meisneri (Wall. ex C.B.Clarke) Golding – Assam

References

hatacoa
Flora of Tibet
Flora of Nepal
Flora of East Himalaya
Flora of Assam (region)
Flora of Bangladesh
Flora of Myanmar
Flora of Thailand
Flora of Vietnam
Plants described in 1825